DWZR (828 AM) Zoom Radio is a radio station owned and operated by Hypersonic Broadcasting Center. The station's studio is located at HBC Bldg., Penaranda St., Brgy. Iraya, Legazpi, Albay.

References

Radio stations in Legazpi, Albay
News and talk radio stations in the Philippines
Radio stations established in 1969